The Mendocino Tree is a coast redwood (Sequoia sempervirens) located in Montgomery Woods State Natural Reserve in Mendocino County, California.

It took the record from a slightly taller tree in Del Norte County, California, after that tree lost height when it was damaged in a storm. A team led by Stephen C. Sillett measured the height of the Mendocino Tree, which was verified by the Guinness Book of World Records. The taller Stratosphere Giant, discovered in 2000, was confirmed to be taller in 2004, and soon afterwards in 2006 the even taller Hyperion took the current record.

Montgomory Woods is remote and "the least visited of Mendocino County's redwood preserves". Nevertheless, because of the difficulty of managing the large number of visitors to the park wishing to see the tree, and potentially damaging its root system, its precise location within Montgomory Woods remains undisclosed, and difficult to discern among dozens of redwoods that are nearly as tall.

References

Individual coast redwood trees
Natural history of Mendocino County, California
Guinness World Records